The Woman and the Puppet (La Femme et le pantin) is an 1898 novel by Pierre Louÿs.

Synopsis
During the carnival in Seville, the Frenchman André Stévenol meets and falls under the spell of Concepción 'Conchita' Pérez, a young Andalusian woman.  His friend, don Mateo Diaz warns him off by describing his own history with the woman – a history of being repeatedly attracted and then rebuffed by her. Conchita continually flirted with other men to torture don Mateo.  On each occasion he was made to feel guilty for his jealous thoughts and actions towards her, until he realised finally that he had been her puppet for fourteen months and in an explosion of passion he beat her.  She then astonished him by declaring the violence a sign of the strength of his love and came to his bed.  She was a virgin. Although the two then started living together, she continued her flirtatious behaviour towards other men and simultaneously became very possessive. Don Mateo left the country and travelled for a year to escape her.

The novel has a short epilogue, described as the moral of the piece.  The Frenchman accidentally meets Conchita again, and they spend the night together.  The next morning, as Conchita packs her bags for Paris, a note is received from don Mateo asking to be taken back into Conchita's good graces.

Adaptation 

An abridged version of the story in English is included in Woman and Puppet, Etc. (1908), a collection of Louÿs works translated and/or adapted by G. F. Monkshood (William James Clarke), published by Greening & Co.

Opera adaptation
1911 – Conchita, an opera in four acts and six scenes by composer Riccardo Zandonai, premiered in Milan at the Teatro dal Verme on 14 October 1911, with Tarquinia Tarquini in the title role.

Film adaptations
1920 – The Woman and the Puppet – Reginald Barker, starring Geraldine Farrar
1929 – The Woman and the Puppet  – Jacques de Baroncelli, starring Conchita Montenegro
1935 – The Devil is a Woman – Josef von Sternberg, starring Marlene Dietrich
 1946 –  (Laabet el sitt, Egypt) – , starring Tahia Carioca
1959 – The Female – Julien Duvivier, starring Brigitte Bardot
1977 – That Obscure Object of Desire – Luis Buñuel, adapted by Jean-Claude Carrière, starring Fernando Rey, Ángela Molina, and Carole Bouquet
 1990 –  (France/Spain) – Mario Camus, starring Maribel Verdú and Pierre Arditi
 2006 – The Woman and the Puppet – Alain Schwarzstein, starring Roger Hanin and Mélissa Djaouzi

References

1898 French novels
French novels adapted into films
Novels adapted into operas
Novels set in Spain
Novels by Pierre Louÿs